Carl Gottfried Franz Albert Kostka (3 December 1846 in Lyck – 28 December 1921 in Insterburg) was a mathematician who introduced Kostka numbers in 1882. He lived and worked in Insterburg.

See also
Kostka polynomial

References

19th-century German mathematicians
20th-century German mathematicians
1846 births
1921 deaths
People from Ełk
Members of the German Academy of Sciences Leopoldina